Two ships of the Royal Australian Navy have been named HMAS Bendigo, for the city of Bendigo, Victoria.

 , a Bathurst-class corvette laid down in 1940 and sold into civilian service in 1946.
 , a Fremantle-class patrol boat laid down in 1981 and decommissioned in 2006.

Battle honours
Ships named HMAS Bendigo have been awarded three battle honours.
 Pacific 1942–44
 New Guinea 1942–44
 Okinawa 1945

References

Royal Australian Navy ship names